Botanic is an adjective related to botany, the study of plants. 

Botanic may also refer to: 
 Botanic (District Electoral Area), an electoral ward of Belfast, Northern Ireland, named after Belfast's Botanic Gardens
 Botanic railway station, serving this area of Belfast

See also
 Botany (disambiguation)
 Botanique (disambiguation)
 Botanical garden (disambiguation)